Arthur Ernest Pothecary (1 March 1906 – 21 May 1991) was an English first-class cricketer. Pothecary was a left-handed batsman who bowled slow left-arm orthodox spin.

Pothecary made his first-class debut for Hampshire County Cricket Club in the 1927 County Championship against Surrey. Early in his career Pothecary was tried by the club as a replacement for the likes of Phil Mead, George Brown, Jack Newman and Alec Kennedy. Early in his career Pothecary showed signs of class, but although a consistent performer, Pothecary's potential was never fully realised.

Pothecary represented Hampshire in 268 first-class matches from 1927 until the Second World War and played a further three for the county after the war in 1946, with his final appearance for the county coming in 1946 against Sussex at Dean Park Cricket Ground, Bournemouth. In his 271 matches for the county, Pothecary scored 9,447 runs at a batting average of 23.34, with 47 half centuries, 9 centuries and a high score of 130 against the touring New Zealanders in 1937. Pothecary scored over 1,000 runs in a season on four occasions: 1933, 1936, 1937 and 1938. With the ball Pothecary took 52 wickets at a bowling average of 41.14, with best figures of 4/47 which came on debut against Surrey; Pothecary's wickets included Jack Hobbs, Andy Sandham, Alfred Jeacocke and Tom Shepherd. In the field Pothecary took 147 catches for Hampshire, fielding mostly at cover point.

Later activities
Pothecary was appointed to the first-class Umpires list in 1949, where from 1949 to 1958 he stood in 254 first-class matches, with his final match standing as an Umpire between an England XI and a Commonwealth XI.

Pothecary later became a groundsman, taking charge of the Royal Air Force Sports Ground in Uxbridge. Pothecary died at Iver, Buckinghamshire on 21 May 1991.

Family
Pothecary's uncle Sidney Pothecary played 12 first-class matches for Hampshire.

External links
Arthur Pothecary at Cricinfo
Arthur Pothecary at CricketArchive
Matches and detailed statistics for Arthur Pothecary

1906 births
1991 deaths
Cricketers from Southampton
English cricketers
Hampshire cricketers
English cricket umpires